Nida Allam (born December 15, 1993) is an American politician, political activist, and data analyst. She currently serves on the Durham County Board of Commissioners, to which she was elected in 2020, making her the first Muslim woman to serve in public office in North Carolina. Allam is one of five women to serve on the Durham County Board of Commissioners; this is the first time the board has consisted entirely of women in its 139-year history.

Since 2018, Allam has served as the Chair of the Durham Mayor’s Council for Women. She was elected as the Third Vice-Chair of the North Carolina Democratic Party and served from 2017 to 2021, becoming the first Muslim to serve on the party’s executive board. On November 8, 2021, Allam announced that she would be seeking the Democratic Party's nomination for Congress in North Carolina's newly redrawn 4th Congressional District.

Early life and education 
Allam was born on December 15, 1993, in Ottawa, Canada. She is the daughter of immigrants, her father is from India and her mother is from Pakistan. Allam has two older sisters. When she was five years old her family moved to Brier Creek, a suburb between Raleigh and Durham in North Carolina, after her father took a job with IBM at Research Triangle Park. When she was six years old the family moved to the nearby town of Cary. She became a naturalized United States citizen as a teenager. Her mother, Iffat Allam, served as the Chair of the Women's Committee at their mosque. Allam and her mother volunteered at local food banks and helped set up homes for single mothers and refugees in the Research Triangle. A devout Muslim, she did not begin wearing the hijab full-time until she was in eighth grade.

Allam graduated from Needham B. Broughton High School, a magnet school in downtown Raleigh, where she was a member of the varsity lacrosse team. As a high school student, she chaired the Triangle Health Fair, a Muslim student-led campaign to partner with local doctors, chiropractors, and dentists to provide free health care to low-income community members.

She graduated from North Carolina State University with a degree in sustainable materials and technology. While at university, she founded the NC State For Bernie Club and became Co-Chair of the Triangle For Bernie Club.

Political career 
Allam was inspired to become politically involved after her best friend, Yusor Mohammad Abu-Salha, was one of the three people killed in the 2015 Chapel Hill shooting. She had been a bridesmaid at Abu-Salha's wedding that December. The shooting targeted members of North Carolina's Muslim community. Allam became involved in the grassroots movement and worked as a political director for U.S. Senator Bernie Sanders' 2016 presidential campaign, as well as an organizing director for Justice Cheri Beasley's campaign for the North Carolina Supreme Court. She was the 2016 Political Director in North Carolina, South Carolina, New Jersey and New York for Sanders' presidential campaign.

She is a 2019 alumna of Durham's chapter of the New Leaders Council.

Initial runs for office 
Allam decided to run for public office after having worked behind the scenes in the progressive movement and with voter mobilization efforts because she believed there needed to be more progressive candidates representing the diversity of the American people. She was elected as the Third Vice Chair of the North Carolina Democratic Party in January 2017, becoming the first Muslim American to serve on the party's executive council, and was appointed as the Chair of the Durham Mayor's Council for Women in 2018.

As a member of the Mayor's Council for Women, she advised Mayor Steve Schewel on issues pertaining to the rights of women and LGBTQIA community members, especially non-binary and transgender people. As Third Vice Chair of the Democratic Party in North Carolina, she served alongside Second Chair Matt Hughes, former First Chair Aisha Dew, Party Secretary Melvin Williams, and former State Party Chairman Wayne Goodwin. She also served as a delegate at the 2016 Democratic National Convention and the 2020 Democratic National Convention.

Durham County Board of Commissioners 
Allam was elected to the Durham County Board of Commissioners in 2020 with endorsements from the Durham Association of Educators, Equality North Carolina, and the People's Alliance PAC. When Allam announced her candidacy for Durham County Commissioner, her family members received Islamophobic hate mail via social media platforms. She was elected to serve alongside Nimasheena Burns, Wendy Jacobs, Heidi Carter, and Brenda Howerton. This was the first time that Durham County has had an all-woman board of commissioners in its 139-year history. Upon her election, she became the first Muslim woman to hold an elected office in North Carolina. She received 39,523 votes  in the primary election and 122,947 votes in the general election, finishing ahead of all other candidates. Her election was celebrated by the Council on American–Islamic Relations and Muslim Advocates.

Congressional candidacy 

On November 8, 2021, Allam announced that she would be seeking the Democratic Party's nomination for Congress in North Carolina's newly redrawn 4th Congressional District. If she were elected, she would be the third Muslim woman to serve in Congress, after Ilhan Omar and Rashida Tlaib, both of whom endorsed Allam's candidacy. Allam lost the primary to her more moderate opponent by 9 points.

Political views 
Allam ran for Durham County Commissioner on a platform centered on addressing economic inequality. Campaign priorities included a $15 minimum wage for county workers, boosting mental health services in schools and investing in businesses run by women and people of color.

She believes that charter schools have increased racial segregation in Durham schools. As a county commissioner, Allam stated she plans to increase the minimum wage of Durham Public Schools classified staff to U.S. $15 an hour and enact property tax assistance programs. She has stated that evictions and lack of affordable housing opportunities are also a crisis in the county, and referenced the issue of gentrification misplacing Black families from their homes in Durham's historical African-American neighborhoods. Allam has also called for more funding and community investment into Durham Public Schools and Durham Technical Community College, saying that education is tied to economic and racial justice issues. Allam supports organized labor unions. She blames the North Carolina General Assembly for inadequate funding for public schools.

Allam has been criticized for her past statements and tweets in regards to Israel that some have seen as Anti-Zionist or anti-Semitic. In 2021, Allam apologized to the Jewish community for her past statements and committed to "a movement for justice and peace, in which anti-Semitism must have no home." While Allam received endorsements in her race from figures like Ilhan Omar, who have been in the past accused of antisemitism, Valerie Foushee, her primary opponent,  began to receive funds and assistance from pro-Israel groups such as AIPAC and Sam Bankman-Fried's Protect Our Future PAC, prompting allegations that Foushee's campaign had succeeded primarily due to support from dark money as the race became "the most expensive Democratic congressional primary in North Carolina history".

Personal life 
She lives in Durham with her husband, Towqir Aziz, and two dogs named Otis and Nala. She and Aziz met in a Muslim Sunday school. Allam is a member of the Women's Islamic Initiative in Spirituality & Equality. She is a citizen of the United States and Canada, and also holds Pakistani citizenship by descent.

In April 2022, Allam announced that she was pregnant. Allam had been pregnant in 2021, but had an abortion due to medical issues.

Electoral History

References 

1993 births
21st-century American politicians
21st-century American women scientists
Bernie Sanders 2016 presidential campaign
American left-wing activists
American people of Indian descent
American people of Pakistani descent
American Muslim activists
Canadian emigrants to the United States
Canadian people of Indian descent
Canadian people of Pakistani descent
Candidates in the 2022 United States House of Representatives elections
County commissioners in North Carolina
Indian Muslim activists
Living people
Needham B. Broughton High School alumni
North Carolina Democrats
North Carolina State University alumni
Pakistani Muslim activists
People from Durham County, North Carolina
Politicians from Ottawa
Scientists from North Carolina
Women data scientists
Women in North Carolina politics
People from Cary, North Carolina